Antonovka is a rural locality (a selo) and the administrative center of Antonovsky Selsoviet of Arkharinsky District, Amur Oblast, Russia. The population was 91 in 2018. There are 10 streets.

Geography 
Antonovka is located 15 km west of Arkhara (the district's administrative centre) by road. Arkhara is the nearest rural locality.

References 

Rural localities in Arkharinsky District